Byomkesh Bakshi a Bengali detective thriller film on Bengali fictional detective Byomkesh Bakshi, released on 16 October 2015. The film is directed by Anjan Dutt. This is the fourth installment of Byomkesh series by Anjan Dutt. The film is based on Kohen Kobi Kalidas by Sharadindu Bandyopadhyay. Unlike the previous three installments, Jisshu Sengupta portrayed the character Bakshi in this one replacing Abir Chatterjee.

Cast
 Jisshu Sengupta as Byomkesh Bakshi
 Saswata Chatterjee as Ajit Bandyopadhyay
 Ushasie Chakraborty as Satyabati (Guest Appearance)
 Kaushik Sen as Gobinda Haldar
 Shantilal Mukherjee as Manish Chakraborty
 Sagnik Chatterjee as Aurobindo Haldar
 Joyjit Banerjee as Phanish Chakraborty
 Prantik Banerjee as Mrigen
 Debdut Ghosh as Madhumoy Sur
 Priyanka Sarkar as Indira (Guest Appearance)
 Ankita Chakraborty as Mohini
 Chandan Sen as Bhuban Das
 Arindol Bagchi as Surapati Ghatak(Guest Appearance)
 Siddhartha Banerjee as Inspector Pramod Barat (Guest Appearance)

Plot synopsis
The curtain rises on a small coalfield town. Plagued with a series of unexplained troubles that broke out suddenly, owner of a coalmine seeks the help of Byomkesh Bakshi to sort things out for him. When Byomkesh arrives with his trusted confidante Ajit, they discover to their complete dismay a maze of crimes woven around a violent murder that had little to do with the job that they were entrusted with. A mesmerizing mosaic of criminal characters, a sordid saga of lecherous lust, the thriller unfolds the complex layers of the human mind, so powerfully penned by Sharadindu, now retold by the master movie-maker Anjan Dutt. Byomkesh eventually cracks the case but seals it with his own sense of justice.

Reception
Upon release, the movie received moderately positive reviews from the critics while it was well received by the public.

Sequel

A hint for the next case was given at the end of this movie. The sequel was released on 7 October 2016.

See also
 Byomkesh Bakshi
 Abar Byomkesh
 Byomkesh Phire Elo

References

External links
 

Bengali-language Indian films
2010s Bengali-language films
2015 films
Indian detective films
2015 crime thriller films
Films directed by Anjan Dutt
Byomkesh Bakshi films
Indian crime thriller films
Films based on works by Saradindu Bandopadhyay